Kelsey Lauren Wog (born September 19, 1998) is a Canadian breaststroke swimmer. She won a silver medal in the 200 m breaststroke at the 2016 FINA World Swimming Championships (25 m). At the 2016 Junior Pan Pacific Swimming Championships in Maui, Wog captured two individual medals. She earned silver in the 200-m breaststroke and bronze in the 100 m breaststroke. She also contributed to a silver medal in the 4×100-m medley relay with teammates Danielle Hanus, Rebecca Smith and Sarah Darcel. She is a resident of Winnipeg, Manitoba, and is currently a member of the Toronto Titans for the International Swimming League.

She was named to the Canadian team for the 2020 Summer Olympics, where she placed twenty-third in the heats of the 100 m breaststroke and was disqualified from the 200 m breaststroke.

At the 2022 World Aquatics Championships, Wog placed first in the heats of the 200 m breakstroke, and then fifth in the semi-finals to qualify for the event final. She was fourth in the event final, 0.66 seconds behind American bronze medalist Kate Douglass. She remarked "fourth is fourth but I'm really proud of my effort." Wogthen competed the breaststroke leg for Team Canada in the heats of the  medley relay, helping the team qualify to the final in fourth position. She was replaced in the final by Rachel Nicol, but shared in the team's bronze medal win.

Awards and honors
2020 Manitoba Bisons Female Athlete of the Year
2020 Lieutenant Governor Athletic Awards Recipient

References

External links
 

1998 births
Living people
Canadian female breaststroke swimmers
Medalists at the FINA World Swimming Championships (25 m)
Swimmers at the 2014 Summer Youth Olympics
Universiade medalists in swimming
Universiade gold medalists for Canada
Medalists at the 2017 Summer Universiade
Sportspeople from Regina, Saskatchewan
Swimmers from Winnipeg
Swimmers at the 2020 Summer Olympics
Olympic swimmers of Canada
World Aquatics Championships medalists in swimming
21st-century Canadian women